American Idols Live! Tour 2005 was a summer concert tour in the United States featuring the top 10 contestants of the fourth season of American Idol, which aired in 2005. It was sponsored by Kellogg Pop-Tarts. It followed in the tradition of other American Idol summer tours following the completion of each season in May. After the poor attendance of the tour the previous year, the tour was scaled down somewhat. Forty dates were initially planned, four more dates were however later added. An extra show was further added at the end of the tour as a benefit concert for the victims of Hurricane Katrina which struck Mississippi two weeks earlier.

Before the Las Vegas show, runner-up Bo Bice came down with serious stomach pains and was rushed to the hospital. He was diagnosed with a blockage in his intestines, and received emergency surgery. He returned for the last two shows of the tour in Syracuse, New York. Bice also broke his foot on stage earlier in the tour at Manchester.

Performers

Show overview

Shows from this year's tour differed significantly from the previous three tours.  Each performer performed their own set of two to three songs to showcase their differing talent. Unlike previous years, ensemble singing was more limited.  There were only a few duets in addition to the obligatory final group performance which consisted of two songs in this tour. The individual sets started off with tenth-place finisher Jessica Sierra and ending with the winner Carrie Underwood, but those in between did not performed in elimination order. The first half of the show ended with Nadia Turner's set, and the second half began with a duet between Anwar Robinson and Vonzell Solomon.

Bo Bice was absent throughout most of the later part of the tour due to his serious nature of his illness that required surgery, and this necessitated modifications and re-arrangement to the tour set list. Extra songs were added by some singers, and a group performance by the male singers was also added.

Setlist
 Jessica Sierra – "(Boys Are) Back in Town" (The Busboys), "Shop Around" (The Miracles)
 Anwar Robinson – "A House Is Not a Home" (Dionne Warwick), "What a Wonderful World" (Louis Armstrong)
 Constantine Maroulis – "Hard to Handle" (Otis Redding), "My Funny Valentine" (Frank Sinatra), "Bohemian Rhapsody" (Queen)
 Nikko Smith – "Part-Time Lover" (Stevie Wonder), "Incomplete" (Sisqó), "Like I Love You" (Justin Timberlake)
 Scott Savol – "Against All Odds (Take a Look at Me Now)" (Phil Collins)
 Savol and Sierra – "Total Eclipse of the Heart" (Bonnie Tyler)
 Savol – "She's Gone" (Hall & Oates)
 Nadia Turner – "The Power of Love" (Ashley Cleveland), "You Don't Have to Say You Love Me" (Dusty Springfield), "Fire" (Jimi Hendrix)/Try a Little Tenderness/(Otis Redding)

Intermission
 Robinson and Vonzell Solomon – "Superstition" (Stevie Wonder), "Karma" (Alicia Keys)
 Solomon – "I Have Nothing" (Whitney Houston), "Best of My Love" (The Emotions), "I'm Every Woman" (Chaka Khan)
 Anthony Fedorov – "Everytime You Go Away" (Hall & Oates), "Can You Stop the Rain" (Peabo Bryson), "I've Got You" (Marc Anthony)
 Bo Bice – "I Don't Want to Be" (Gavin DeGraw), "Vehicle" (Ides of March), "Voodoo Chile" (The Jimi Hendrix Experience), "Sweet Home Alabama" (Lynyrd Skynyrd)
 Carrie Underwood – "Sin Wagon" (Dixie Chicks), "Independence Day" (Martina McBride), "Alone" (Heart), "Inside Your Heaven" (Carrie Underwood)
 Underwood and Bice – "Bless the Broken Road" (Rascal Flatts)
 Top 10 – "Lean on Me" (The Temptations) and "R.O.C.K. in the U.S.A. (A Salute to '60s Rock)" (John Mellencamp)

Additional notes
 After he broke his foot during the previous show in Manchester, New Hampshire, Bo Bice replaced "I Don't Wanna Be" with "Desperado" (Eagles) from Cleveland onwards so he can perform seated at the piano.
 Nadia Turner was absent in Manchester due to illness.
 Beginning on August 18 in Las Vegas, Bo Bice did not perform due to his surgery until the end of the tour except for the last two shows.
 A number of changes were made after Bo Bice's departure – a video of him performing "Vehicle" was shown, then "Sweet Home Alabama" was performed as a group song by the five remaining men.
 Carrie Underwood performed "Cold Day in July" (Dixie Chicks cover) instead of her duet with Bo "Bless the Broken Road" in Las Vegas, but she later chose to perform "Bless the Broken Road" as a solo.
 Anwar Robinson also added "Ribbon in the Sky" (Stevie Wonder) in Las Vegas.
 Constantine Maroulis's set was moved down to the second half to replace Bo Bice's set.
On August 20 in San Jose Vonzell Solomon added "I'll Never Love This Way Again" to her set list.
On August 17 in Los Angeles, Anthony Fedorov added "Historia de un Amor" to his set list.
Bo Bice returned to perform his set in New York, but did not perform his song "We Can't Change This World" at the Hurricane Katrina benefit show as previously announced in the press.

Tour dates

Response
The tour returned to form after the dismal Season 3 tour. Excluding the sold-out Hurricane Katrina benefit show, the average attendance was at 89% capacity, with 12 of the 43 shows sold out. Excluding the last charity show in Syracuse, the revenue from ticket sales totalled $17,364,290 million with 392,094 tickets sold according to Billboard.

Tour summary
Number of shows – 44 (13 sold out)
Total gross – $17,364,290 (43 shows)
Total attendance – 392,094 (43 shows)
Average attendance – 9,118 (89%)
Average ticket price – $44.29

References

American Idol concert tours
2005 concert tours